ESPN Integration is an agreement between ESPN and video game developer Electronic Arts to put various ESPN features in EA Sports games. The first game to feature ESPN Integration was the college baseball game MVP 06 NCAA Baseball. The features that have so far appeared include a streaming ticker at the bottom of the screen with real up to date sports scores, just as it appears on the ESPN channel. This ticker does not just crawl during menus and load screens but also in actual gameplay. Another feature is the ability to listen to sports updates from ESPN Radio, and a third feature is being able to read the top 40 sports stories from ESPN.com.  

Much of this deal was done on the part of EA Sports to prevent ESPN from selling its brand name to another game manufacturer, like they did with SEGA. Their ESPN NFL 2K5 game featured total ESPN integration, complete with authentic music, graphics, rendered sets, pre-half-and post game commentary by Chris Berman, and Sunday Night Football telecast crew. That along with innovations in gameplay cut into EA Sports dominant Madden NFL franchise, leading EA to sign an exclusive deal with the NFL.

References

External links
Interview about ESPN Integration on IGN

Integration